Lingaraj Panigrahi was an Indian politician and former Chief Justice of Orissa High Court. He is the father of Pramod Panigrahi, former Law Secretary of Government of Odisha.

Career
Panigrahi was born in Ganjam District. He initially studied in Khallikote Autonomous College, passed I.Sc. from Ravenshaw College of Cuttack and entered into the Presidency College, Madras. He completed his B.L. degree from Madras Law College. Panigrahi practiced at Berhampur. He became the Government Pleader in 1930. Panigrahi was appointed the Advocate General of Odisha in 1945. On 26 July 1948 he was elevated to the post of judge of Orissa High Court and in 1953 he became the Chief Justice of this High Court. After the retirement in 1956 he joined Indian National Congress and contested from Berhampur Vidhan Sabha constituency. Panigrahi became a member of Odisha Legislative Assembly in 1952 and became the speaker of the Assembly since 1961–67.

References

Judges of the Orissa High Court
People from Ganjam district
Chief Justices of the Orissa High Court
Speakers of the Odisha Legislative Assembly
Odisha MLAs 1952–1957
Ravenshaw University alumni
Presidency College, Chennai alumni
20th-century Indian judges
Indian National Congress politicians from Odisha